Santoso is an Indonesian surname. Notable people with this surname include:

 Ade Yusuf Santoso (born 1993), Indonesian badminton player 
 Aji Santoso (born 1970), an Indonesian former footballer and currently a coach
 Asep Budi Santoso (born 1990), Indonesian football defender
 Djoko Santoso (born 1952), retired Indonesian general
 Iman Budhi Santoso (born 1948), Indonesian author of poetry collections, novels, and short stories
 Santoso, alias Abu Wardah (1976-2016), Islamic leader of East Indonesia Mujahideen
 Maria Ulfah Santoso (1911-1988), Indonesian women's rights activist and politician
 Budi Santoso (born 1975), Indonesian retired badminton player
 Dendi Santoso (born 1990), Indonesian football winger
 Hoegeng Iman Santoso (1921-2004), Chief of the Indonesian National Police
 Mona Santoso (born 1982), former Indonesian badminton player
 Ryan Santoso (born 1995), American football placekicker and punter 
 Simon Santoso (born 1985), Indonesian male badminton player
 Surya Santoso, American electrical engineer, academic, senior member of the IEEE

See also 
 Santos (disambiguation)

Indonesian-language surnames
Surnames of Indonesian origin